John Bocwinski (born November 22, 1936 in Buenos Aires, Argentina) was an Argentine-American soccer defender who was a member of the U.S. Olympic soccer team at the 1972 Summer Olympics

Player

Youth
Bocwinski, born in Argentina to immigrant Polish parents, living in Argentina until he was sixteen when he emigrated to the United States with his family. They arrived in February 1953 and settled in Kenosha, Wisconsin. Bocwinski immediately began playing soccer with local teams, first Polonia S.C. and then Syrena S.C., both located in Hammond, Indiana.

Senior
In 1955, he joined Polonia S.C. in Milwaukee, Wisconsin. He was drafted into the U.S. Army in 1959, serving his time in Germany where he was the captain of the U.S. Armed Forces soccer team. In 1961, he was released from the Army. He moved to Chicago, Illinois where he joined the A.A.C. Eagles of the National Soccer League of Chicago  Two years later, he rejoined Milwaukee Polonia.

U.S. Olympic team
In 1970, he was selected for the U.S. Olympic soccer team as it began qualifications for the 1972 Summer Olympics.  In 1971, the team played in the Pan American Games. The U.S. placed second in its first round group, but at the bottom of the standings in the final group. Despite this setback, the team went on to qualify for the Olympic tournament. Bocwinski played the first two U.S. games, a 0-0 tie with Mexico and a 3-0 loss to Malaysia.

Coach
In 1983, Bocwinski became the head coach at Carthage College in Kenosha. In his two seasons as coach, he took the team to a 12-21-2 (.371) record.

In addition to playing and coaching soccer, Bocwinski also worked over thirty years for the American Motors Corporation. In 1987, he was inducted into the Wisconsin Soccer Association Hall of Fame.

References

External links
USASA Hall of Fame

1936 births
Living people
Footballers from Buenos Aires
Sportspeople from Kenosha, Wisconsin
Military personnel from Wisconsin
Argentine emigrants to the United States
American soccer players
Footballers at the 1971 Pan American Games
Pan American Games competitors for the United States
Footballers at the 1972 Summer Olympics
Olympic soccer players of the United States
American soccer coaches
A.A.C. Eagles players
National Soccer League (Chicago) players
Carthage College
Argentine people of Polish descent
American people of Polish descent
Soccer players from Wisconsin
Association football defenders